Lucinisca is a genus of saltwater clams, marine bivalve molluscs in the subfamily Lucininae of the family Lucinidae.

Species
 † Lucinisca arrogans Olsson, 1964 
 † Lucinisca bocasensis Olsson, 1922 
 † Lucinisca calhounensis (Dall, 1903) 
 Lucinisca centrifuga (Dall, 1901)
 † Lucinisca cribraria (Say, 1824) 
 Lucinisca fenestrata (Hinds, 1845)
 Lucinisca muricata (Spengler, 1798)
 Lucinisca nassula (Conrad, 1846)
 Lucinisca nuttalli (Conrad, 1837)
 † Lucinisca plesiolophus (Dall, 1900) 
 †Lucinisca protista Woodring, 1982 
 † Lucinisca roigi (Maury, 1925) 
 † Lucinisca silicata (Mansfield, 1937)

References

 Taylor J. & Glover E. (2021). Biology, evolution and generic review of the chemosymbiotic bivalve family Lucinidae. London: The Ray Society [Publication 182]. 319 pp.
 Coan, E. V.; Valentich-Scott, P. (2012). Bivalve seashells of tropical West America. Marine bivalve mollusks from Baja California to northern Peru. 2 vols, 1258 pp.

External links
 Dall W.H. (1901). Synopsis of the Lucinacea and of the American species. Proceedings of the United States National Museum. 23: 779-833, pls 39-42
 aylor J.D. & Glover E.A. (2016). Lucinid bivalves of Guadeloupe: diversity and systematics in the context of the tropical Western Atlantic (Mollusca: Bivalvia: Lucinidae). Zootaxa. 4196(3): 301-380

Lucinidae
Bivalve genera